North Star School District No. 10 is a school district headquartered in Cando, North Dakota. It operates North Star Public School.

Within Towner County it includes Cando, Bisbee, and Egeland. It also includes sections in Benson, Pierce, Ramsey, and Rolette counties.

History
In 2008 the Bisbee-Egeland School District and the Cando School District were dissolved and merged into the current North Star School District. The Bisbee-Engeland School immediately closed with all students sent to Cando. In Cando, the vote succeeded with 351 approving and 10 disapproving. In October 2007 people in the Bisbee-Egeland district voted to consolidate with 189 for and 16 against.

When Wolford School District closed in 2019, North Star School was an option for those students. Upon disestablishment of the Wolford district, North Star is to take a portion of the district.

References

External links
 North Star School
School districts in North Dakota
Education in Benson County, North Dakota
Education in Pierce County, North Dakota
Education in Ramsey County, North Dakota
Education in Rolette County, North Dakota
Towner County, North Dakota
2008 establishments in North Dakota
School districts established in 2008